Fight Fire with Fire may refer to:

"Fight Fire With Fire", a single by Mai Tai (band) 1987
 "Fight Fire with Fire" (Kansas song)
 "Fight Fire with Fire" (Metallica song)
 "Fight Fire with Fire" (The Prodigy song)

Fighting Fire with Fire may refer to:

 Fighting Fire with Fire (album), an album by Davis Daniel
 "Fighting Fire with Fire" (song), the title song by Davis Daniel
 "Fighting Fire with Fire" (Arrow), an episode of Arrow

Fire with Fire may refer to:

 Fire with Fire (1986 film), a romantic drama film starring Craig Sheffer and Virginia Madsen
 Fire with Fire (2012 film), an action film starring Joshua Duhamel, Rosario Dawson, and Bruce Willis
 Fire with Fire, a 2013 book by Charles Gannon
 "Fire with Fire" (song), a song by the Scissor Sisters from Night Work
 "Fire with Fire" (Gossip song)
 Fire with Fire, a 1993 feminist book by Naomi Wolf

See also
 Controlled burn